1998 in professional wrestling describes the year's events in the world of professional wrestling.

List of notable promotions 
These promotions held notable shows in 1998.

Calendar of notable shows

January

February

March

April

May

June

July

August

September

October

November

December

Accomplishments and tournaments

AAA

AJPW

NJPW

WCW

WWF

Awards and honors

Pro Wrestling Illustrated

Wrestling Observer Newsletter

Wrestling Observer Newsletter Hall of Fame

Wrestling Observer Newsletter awards

Title changes

ECW

FMW

NJPW

WCW

WWF

Births
June 18 - Masha Slamovich 
September 17 - Towa Iwasaki 
November 23 - Rina Shingaki

Debuts
 A.J. Styles
 Amazing Red
 Vince McMahon 
 Chuck Palumbo 
 Rodney Mack
 Sal E. Graziano 
 January 31 – Thanomsak Toba
 August 21 – Kurt Angle
 September 6 – Quiet Storm
 September 13 - Tigre Uno
 September 25 - Low Ki
 December 14 – Faby Apache

Retirements
 Austin Idol (1972–1998)
 Antonio Inoki (September 30, 1960–April 4, 1998) (returned to wrestling in 2000 and retired on December 30, 2001)
 Marcus Laurinaitis (1987–1998)
 Joey Maggs (1987–1998)
 Rick Martel (1973–1998)
 Shawn Michaels (1984-March 28, 1998) (returned to wrestling in 2002 and retired in 2010)
 John Nord (1984-1998) 
 The Patriot (wrestler) (1988-1998) 
 Sgt. Craig Pittman (1993-1998) (returned to wrestling for two matches in 2011)
 Paul Roma (1984–1998) (returned to wrestling in 2006) 
 The Sheik (wrestler) (1947-1998) 
 Mark Starr (1986–1998)
 Pez Whatley (1973-1998)

Deaths 
 January 20 – Bobo Brazil, 73
 February 15 – Louie Spicolli, 27
 April 6 - Stanley Radwan, 89 
 June 2 – Junkyard Dog, 45
 July 1 - Toyonobori, 67
 July 20 - June Byers, 76
 August 17 – Terry Garvin, 61
 August 18 – Shane Shamrock, 23
 November 6 – Sky Low Low, 70
 November 29 – Giant Haystacks, 51
 December 15 – Brady Boone, 40
 December 30 - Sam Muchnick, 93

See also
List of WCW pay-per-view events
List of WWF pay-per-view events
List of FMW supercards and pay-per-view events
List of ECW supercards and pay-per-view events

References

 
professional wrestling